Pahurehure is a suburb of Auckland, in northern New Zealand. It is located on the south-eastern shores of the Manukau Harbour, under the authority of the Auckland Council. The suburb makes up the southernmost part of the Auckland urban area.

Demographics

Pahurehure had a population of 3,264 at the 2018 New Zealand census, an increase of 213 people (7.0%) since the 2013 census, and an increase of 231 people (7.6%) since the 2006 census. There were 1,032 households, comprising 1,611 males and 1,653 females, giving a sex ratio of 0.97 males per female. The median age was 37.0 years (compared with 37.4 years nationally), with 633 people (19.4%) aged under 15 years, 678 (20.8%) aged 15 to 29, 1,485 (45.5%) aged 30 to 64, and 471 (14.4%) aged 65 or older.

Ethnicities were 70.2% European/Pākehā, 16.3% Māori, 9.3% Pacific peoples, 17.4% Asian, and 3.2% other ethnicities. People may identify with more than one ethnicity.

The percentage of people born overseas was 25.5, compared with 27.1% nationally.

Although some people chose not to answer the census's question about religious affiliation, 42.9% had no religion, 39.6% were Christian, 0.6% had Māori religious beliefs, 3.9% were Hindu, 0.4% were Muslim, 0.7% were Buddhist and 6.6% had other religions.

Of those at least 15 years old, 513 (19.5%) people had a bachelor's or higher degree, and 447 (17.0%) people had no formal qualifications. The median income was $38,100, compared with $31,800 nationally. 534 people (20.3%) earned over $70,000 compared to 17.2% nationally. The employment status of those at least 15 was that 1,455 (55.3%) people were employed full-time, 363 (13.8%) were part-time, and 87 (3.3%) were unemployed.

History
Recently, Pahurehure became recognised as an independent suburb. The previous area was referred to as a small area within Papakura, but has now developed into a suburban area, stretching from north of Beach Road moving up to Ray Small Park on the eastern border and including the entire peninsula located on the western side of the southern motorway.

During the major reformation of local government in 1989, the Pahurehure area was included into the Papakura District boundaries.

In 2010, after a review of the Royal Commission on Auckland Governance, the entire Auckland Region was amalgamated into a single city authority. As well as the former Papakura District, all other territorial authorities were merged into a single Auckland Council. The suburb of Pahurehure is part of the Papakura Local Board within the Manurewa-Papakura ward.

Facilities

Housing
Pahurehure has several modern suburban styled houses. The area is similar to the nearby suburb of Rosehill, and is known as the picturesque area of the district. The surrounding areas in Hingaia and Karaka has been heavily constructed into housing developments which has increased the local property values in Pahurehure.

Transport
Auckland's southern motorway runs straight through Pahurehure, with the main Papakura on and off ramps in the area also. Train and bus services provide the bulk of public transport in the Papakura Town Centre, a 5-minute drive away.

The Southern Path runs alongside the southern motorway which provides cycle and foot links from Takanini to Papakura and neighbouring suburbs. The shared path opened in 2021 as part of the Southern Corridor motorway upgrade.

The Te Mara O Hine footbridge extends over the southern motorway and provides an pedestrian link between Pahurehure and the Karaka Harbourside subdivision.

Recreation
Ray Small Park serves the local children and sports teams in Pahurehure and Papakura. Also the Pahurehure Peninsula is right on the Manukau Harbour, which has boat access in the local area.

Education

Notes 

Suburbs of Auckland
Populated places around the Manukau Harbour